In Federal Election Commission v. Massachusetts Citizens for Life, Inc., 479 U.S. 238 (1986), the U.S. Supreme Court ruled that Massachusetts Citizens for Life, Inc. violated the Federal Election Campaign Act by distributing flyers asking voters to vote “for life” paid for with treasury funds. However, the court also ruled that the FECA section that required any spending by corporations on political campaigning to be done through political action committees (PACs) was itself a violation of the First Amendment rights of nonprofit political and ideological groups.

See also 
 FEC v. National Conservative PAC
 FEC v. Wisconsin Right to Life, Inc.
 Citizens United v. FEC

References

External links
 

United States Supreme Court cases of the Rehnquist Court
United States Supreme Court cases
United States Free Speech Clause case law
Federal Election Commission litigation
1986 in United States case law
United States elections case law
Anti-abortion movement